Ridge Hill Memorial Park is a  cemetery (60 of which are developed) located in Lorain County, Ohio. Started in 1929. It is affiliated with no faith and non-sectarian. Ridge Hill Memorial Park is known as the best maintained and most desirable cemetery in Lorain County, Ohio. Ridge Hill Memorial Park is a private, non-profit, perpetual-care cemetery under the current leadership of President Mike Ireland and Operations Manager Gavin Baker.

Notable interments
 Henry Cooke 'Irish' McIlveen, baseball player
 William Knox Schroeder, Kent State University shooting victim

References
 Cemetery homepage

External links
 

Cemeteries in Lorain County, Ohio
Protected areas of Lorain County, Ohio